Merapah is a town in the Shire of Cook, Queensland, Australia. The town is within the locality of Yarraden.

References

Shire of Cook
Localities in Queensland